Coleotechnites albicostata, the white-edged coleotechnites moth, is a moth of the family Gelechiidae. It is found in North America, where it has been recorded from Alabama, Maryland, Mississippi, New Jersey, North Carolina, Ontario and Tennessee.

The wingspan is 9–10 mm. The forewings are ocherous white with a broad, black longitudinal streak from the base to the center of the wing. The hindwings are dirty white. Adults are on wing from May to August.

The larvae feed on Juniperus virginiana. They mine the leaves of their host plant. The mine starts near the base of a branch and is directed towards the tip. The species overwinters in the mine and resumes feeding in spring.

References

Moths described in 1978
Coleotechnites